Josh Morris (born 7 November 2001) is a professional Australian rules footballer with the Hawthorn Football Club in the Australian Football League (AFL). Hawthorn selected Morris with Pick 57 in the 2019 AFL Draft.

Early career

A fast leading and dangerous forward, Morris played for Woodville-West Torrens in the SANFL Reserves competition in 2019, where he averaged eight disposals across his five outings.

AFL career

Morris's AFL career was initially hampered by the Covid-19 pandemic. As a young player coming into the system Morris would normally start by playing with the Hawthorn affiliate Box Hill Hawks, but because that competition had been suspended for the year he had to show his metal with scratch matches against other AFL clubs.

Morris made his AFL debut in round 6, 2020, against  at GIANTS Stadium.

Statistics
Updated to the end of the 2022 season.

|-
| 2020 ||  || 35
| 4 || 1 || 2 || 14 || 9 || 23 || 5 || 6 || 0.3 || 0.5 || 3.5 || 2.2 || 5.8 || 1.3 || 1.5 || 0
|-
| 2021 ||  || 35
| 5 || 0 || 1 || 4 || 2 || 6 || 1 || 5 || 0.0 || 0.2 || 0.8 || 0.4 || 1.2 || 0.2 || 1.0 || 0
|-
| 2022 ||  || 35
| 6 || 0 || 0 || 26 || 20 || 46 || 8 || 4 || 0.0 || 0.0 || 4.3 || 3.3 || 7.7 || 1.3 || 0.7 || 0
|- class="sortbottom"
! colspan=3| Career
! 15 !! 1 !! 3 !! 44 !! 31 !! 75 !! 14 !! 15 !! 0.1 !! 0.2 !! 2.9 !! 2.1 !! 5.0 !! 0.9 !! 1.0 !! 0
|}

Notes

References

External links

Living people
2001 births
Woodville-West Torrens Football Club players
Box Hill Football Club players
Hawthorn Football Club players